Gregory Freidin (born 1946) is an American literary scholar and Professor Emeritus of Slavic Languages and Literatures at Stanford University. He is known for his expertise on comparative literature. He was Dmitri Keuseff Professor of Slavic Studies from 2003 until 2004.

References

Living people
Comparative literature academics
1946 births
Stanford University faculty